By Heart is an album by Lea Salonga, released in 1999. It peaked at #1 in the Philippines on both the pop and R&B/soul albums chart. It produced two #1 crossover hits. The album went 3× platinum and sold 2 million copies worldwide. The album earned positive reviews and was backed up by a successful the tour. This album was vital to her success, because BMG Records (Pilipinas) Inc. was going to end her contract if this album failed like I'd Like to Teach The World to Sing.

Track listing
"I Remember the Boy"
"Let the Pain Remain"
"I Will Always Stay This Way in Love with You"
"I Don't Love You Anymore"
"Till I Met You"
"How Can I?"
"Can We Just Stop and Talk Awhile?"
"Once Upon a Life"
"Afraid for Love to Fade"
"Say That You Love Me"
"A Long, Long Time Ago"

References

Lea Salonga albums
1999 albums